General Thomas R. MacQueen (1792–1840) was a British Army officer in the 45th Bengal Native Infantry regiment of the British East India Company's Bengal Army.

MacQueen collected natural history specimens in the Himalayas and northwest India. While a major of the 45th, MacQueen presented a specimen of a bustard species he had shot to the British Museum (Natural History) and in 1832 the bird was named for him as the MacQueen's bustard, Chlamydotis macqueenii, by J. E. Gray.

References 

1792 births
1840 deaths
British East India Company Army generals